The Newfoundland and Labrador Tankard is the Newfoundland and Labrador provincial championship for men's curling. The tournament is run by the Newfoundland and Labrador Curling Association. The winner represents Team Newfoundland and Labrador at the Tim Hortons Brier.

Champions
(National champions in bold)

References
Curling NL - List of champions 

The Brier provincial tournaments
Curling in Newfoundland and Labrador